Deep Forest is the first studio album by the musical group Deep Forest, consisting of French duo Éric Mouquet and Michel Sanchez.  The album mixes New Age electronics with UNESCO field recordings of music from the Democratic Republic of the Congo, the Solomon Islands, Burundi, Tibesti, and the Sahel. Deep Forest was nominated for the Grammy Award as Best World Music Album in 1994. For Sanchez and Mouquet, the most important purpose of the album was to express their own fascination with the Efe people, and open the world's ears to the exquisite sound of a quickly vanishing culture. As Mouquet noted, "It's not very often you can hear a Pygmy singing on the radio." However this purpose was not realised as no Efe, or indeed any Pygmy people featured on the album or any of its samples. 

More than 3,5 million units were sold worldwide. The album went gold in the US, France, platinum in Australia, and gold in the UK. The songs "Sweet Lullaby", "Deep Forest", "Forest Hymn" and "Savana Dance" were released as singles, the first two of which became hits worldwide.

The album currently remains out of print, due to copyright and attribution disputes over the sampling of music from indigenous peoples. Though a percentage of the profits from sales of Deep Forest goes to the Pygmy Fund, a California-based organization committed to helping the natives of central Africa cope with environmental threats to their homeland, it has been noted that the indigenous groups featured on the album would not be assisted by the Pygmy Fund, and that tax returns submitted by the fund did not show a significant increase in donations.

In 2005 Joni Mitchell included two tracks from this album, "Night Bird" and "The First Twilight", as related to her musical development on her Artist's Choice CD.

Track listing
All songs by Eric Mouquet and Michel Sanchez, except where indicated
 "Deep Forest" – 5:34
 "Sweet Lullaby" – 3:53
 "Hunting" – 3:27
 "Night Bird" – 4:18
 "The First Twilight" (Cooky Cue, Mouquet, Sanchez) – 3:18
 "Savana Dance" (Cue, Mouquet, Sanchez) – 4:25
 "Desert Walk" – 5:14
 "White Whisper" – 5:45
 "The Second Twilight" (Cue, Mouquet, Sanchez) – 1:24 (1994 World Mix re-release length is 3:02)
 "Sweet Lullaby (Ambient Mix)" – 3:41
 "Forest Hymn" – 5:50 (Japanese bonus track)

On some pressings of the album, an extended version of "The Second Twilight" appears. This version lasts 3:01.

Personnel
 Eric Mouquet – arrangement, keyboards, and programming
 Michel Sanchez – arrangement, keyboards, and programming
 Cooky Cue – keyboards and programming on "Savana Dance"
 Michel Villain – vocals

Credits
 Composed By – Cue (tracks: 5 6 9), Mouquet, Sanchez
 Producer – Dan Lacksman

Charts

Weekly charts

Year-end charts

Certifications

References

External links
 Details, samples and lyrics with translations from Deep Forest
 Michel Sanchez official website
 Eric Mouquet official website

1992 debut albums
Deep Forest albums
550 Music albums